Senator Kittleman may refer to:

Allan H. Kittleman (born 1958), Maryland State Senate
Robert H. Kittleman (1926–2004), Maryland State Senate